The 2012 United States presidential election in Kansas took place on November 6, 2012, as part of the 2012 United States presidential election in which all 50 states plus the District of Columbia participated. Kansas voters chose six electors to represent them in the Electoral College via a popular vote pitting incumbent Democratic President Barack Obama and his running mate, Vice President Joe Biden, against Republican challenger and former Massachusetts Governor Mitt Romney and his running mate, Congressman Paul Ryan. Romney and Ryan carried the state with 59.66% of the popular vote to Obama's and Biden's 38.05%, thus winning the state's six electoral votes.

Obama carried only two counties: Douglas, home to Lawrence and the University of Kansas; and Wyandotte, home to Kansas City and the state's largest concentration of nonwhite voters. He lost Crawford County, home to Pittsburg State University, which he won in 2008, thereby making him the first Democrat to win the White House without carrying this county since John F. Kennedy in 1960.

Caucuses

Democratic
No major Democratic candidate challenged President Obama for the Democratic nomination in 2012. Obama thus won all 517 votes at the State Convention on June 9 and all 53 delegates.

Republican

The Republican caucuses were held on Saturday, March 10, 2012. Kansas has 40 delegates to the 2012 Republican National Convention. 25 of these delegates are allocated proportionally to candidates who exceed a 20% threshold in the statewide vote tally. The 15 remaining delegates are 'winner-take-all' delegates. 12 delegates are given (3 each) to the candidates with most votes in each of Kansas's 4 congressional districts. 3 delegates are awarded to the candidate with most votes statewide.

Rick Santorum won the caucus and will receive 33 delegates. He won the state with 51% of the statewide vote and received most votes in all of the congressional districts, thus winning 15 delegates. As only Santorum and Mitt Romney exceeded the 20% threshold, 18 of the 25 proportionally allocated delegates were allocated to Santorum and 7 to Romney.

General election

Results

By county

Counties that flipped from Democratic to Republican
 Crawford (largest city: Pittsburg)

By congressional district
Romney won all 4 congressional districts.

See also
 United States presidential elections in Kansas
 2012 Republican Party presidential primaries
 Results of the 2012 Republican Party presidential primaries
 Kansas Republican Party

References

External links
The Green Papers: for Kansas
The Green Papers: Major state elections in chronological order

United States President
Kansas
2012